Hampshire's total economy (worth £22.9bn) is the largest economy in England outside London, providing almost 3% of total GDP for the UK as a whole.

Economy 
See Hampshire#Economy for more information.

Law & regulations 
Hampshire Trading Standards Service originated from the initial introduction of the Weights and Measures Act, and is still better known as the Inspectors of Weights and Measures. Trading Standards Service activities are still primarily enforcement of the Weights and Measures Act, but also has the following responsibilities, in whole or in part, as of 31 March 1988;

 Agriculture Act 1970 (Part IV) 
 Agriculture Produce (Grading and Marking) Acts 1928 and 1931 
 Animal Health Act 1981 
 Business Names Act 1985 
 Celluloid and Cinematograph Act 1922 
 Consumer Credit Act 1974
 Consumer Protection Act 1987 
 Control of Pollution Act 1974 
 Energy Conservation Act 1981 
 Estate Agents Act 1979 
 European Communities Act 1972
 Explosives Acts 1875 and 1923 
 Fabrics (Misdescription) Act 1913 
 Fair Trading Act 1973 
 Fireworks Act 1951 
 Food Act 1984 
 Hallmarking Act 1973
 Health and Safety at Work etc. Act 1974
 Medicines Act 1968
 Motor Cycle Noise Act 1987 
 Performing Animals (Regulation) Act 1925 
 Petroleum (Regulations) Act 1928 and 1936 
 Poisons Act 1972
 Prices Acts 1974 and 1975 
 Road Traffic Acts 1972 and 1974 
 Road Traffic (Foreign Vehicles) Act 1972 
 Telecommunications Act 1984 
 Tourism (Sleeping Accommodation Price Display) Order 1977 
 Trade Descriptions Acts 1968 and 1972 
 Trading Representations (Disabled Persons) Act 1958 
 Trading Representations (Disabled Persons Amendment Act) 1972
 Trading Stamps Act 1964 
 Transport Act 1978 
 Unsolicited Goods and Services Acts 1971 and 1975 
 Weights and Measures Act 1985

Today the Hampshire County Council Regulatory Services Commission publishes advice on local business advice on its web site .

Small business advice 
Advice for new businesses is available from a number of private ventures and government funded schemes. Advice is available from Business Link, Department of Trade and Industry and the HM Revenue and Customs.

Business award schemes 
Hampshire County Council and the Economic Development Office sponsor a number of local business awards.

Business directories 
These web sites provide information on local Hampshire businesses (as opposed to UK-wide Business directories);
 Hampshire County Council
 iHampshire 
 South Online

Business parks & premises 
Andover
 Andover Airfield Business Park (RDC under construction)
 Anton Business Park (light industrial / warehouses)
 Basepoint (offices / light industrial)
 Commercial Centre (offices / light industrial)
 Glenmore Business Park (light industrial)
 Portway Industrial Estate (industrial / warehouses)
 Walworth Industrial Estate (industrial / warehouses)

Basingstoke
 Basing View (offices)
 Bilton Ind Easte ( Warehouses and offices)
 Chineham Business Park (offices / light industrial)
 Crockford Lane (offices / light industrial)
 Daneshill East (industrial warehouse)
 Hampshire International Business Park (offices / light industrial)
 Houndmills Industrial Estate (industrial / warehouse)
 Intec Business Park (offices / Technical park)
 Kingsland Bersford Centre
 Moniton Estate (industrial)
 Viables Business Park (offices)
 West Ham Industrial Estate (industrial / warehouse)

East Hampshire
 Hazleton Industrial Estate (industrial)
 Hazleton Industrial Park (industrial / warehouse)
 Petersfield Business Park (industrial / warehouse)
 Wessex Gate, Horndean (industrial)
 Westfield Estate, Horndean (offices / light industrial)

Eastleigh
 Barton Park (industrial / warehouse)
 Boyatt Wood (industrial / warehouse)
 Chandlers Ford Industrial Estate (offices / industrial / warehouse)
 Hampshire Corporate Park (offices)
 Phoenix Park (industrial)
 Southampton International Park (offices / industrial / warehouse)
 Tower Park (industrial / warehouse)
 Turnpike (offices)

Fareham
 Apex Centre (industrial)
 Bridge Industries (industrial / office)
 Cams Hall (office)
 Duncan Road (industrial / warehouse)
 Fareham Enterprise Centre (offices)
 Fareham Heights (industrial / warehouse / offices)
 Fareham Industrial Park (industrial / warehouse / offices)
 Fort Fareham (industrial / warehouse)
 Fort Wallington (industrial)
 Kites Croft (industrial / warehouse / offices)
 Murrills Trading Estate (industrial / warehouse)
 Newgate Lane (industrial / warehouse)
 Palmerston Lane (industrial / warehouse)
 Pennant Park (industrial / warehouse / office)
 Portchester Park (industrial / warehouse)
 Segensworth (offices / industrial / warehouse)
 Solent Business Park (offices)
 Speedfields Park (industrial / warehouse)
 Talisman Business Centre (industrial / warehouse)

Gosport
 Clarence Wharf (industrial)
 Cranbourne Road (industrial)
 Fareham Road (industrial / warehouse)
 Fort Brockhurst (industrial)
 Forton Road (industrial)
 Harbour Road (industrial)
 Heritage Business Park (freehold)
 Quay Lane (industrial)
 Westfield Industrial Estate (industrial)

Hart (district)
 Ancells Farm (offices)
 Bartley Osborne Way (offices)
 Blackbushe Business Park (industrial)
 Murrell Green Business Park (industrial)
 Pale Lane Farm (offices / industrial / warehouse)
 Redfields Park (offices / industrial)
 Sandy Lane Business Park (offices)
 Waterfront (offices)

Havant
 Aysgarth Road (industrial)
 Brambles Business Centre (offices)
 Brambles Industrial Estate (office / industrial / warehouse / leisure)
 Brockhampton North Industrial Estate (industrial)
 Byngs Business Park (industrial)
 Kingscroft Business Park (industrial)
 Oakwood Centre (offices)
 North Havant Industrial Estate (industrial / warehouse)
 Parkwood Centre (industrial / warehouse / offices)
 Brambles Farm (industrial)
 Stratfield Park (industrial)
 Waterlooville Industrial Estate (industrial)

Portsmouth
 Acorn Business Park (offices)
 Bilton Business Park (industrial / warehouse)
 Blueprint (industrial)
 Challenge Enterprise Centre (managed offices)
 Dundas Industrial Estate (industrial / warehouse)
 Fairways Business Centre (industrial)
 Farlington Road (industrial / warehouse / retail)
 Fitzherbert Industrial Estate (industrial / warehouse / retail)
 Flathouse Quay (industrial)
 Fratton (industrial)
 Limberline Estate (industrial / warehouse)
 North Harbour Business Park (offices)
 Portchester Park (industrial)
 Portsmouth Enterprise Centre (managed offices / industrial)
 Quadra Point (industrial / warehouse)
 Railway Triangle (industrial / warehouse)
 Shawcross Industrial Estate (industrial)
 Walton Road (industrial / warehouse)
 Warrier Business Centre (managed offices)
 Western Road Industrial Estate (industrial / warehouse)

Rushmoor
 Bellevue Enterprise Centre (office / industrial)
 Bellevue Industrial Estate (industrial)
 Blackwater Valley (industrial)
 Deadbrook Lane (industrial / warehouse)
 Eastern Road (industrial)
 Farnborough Aerodrome (research & development)
 Holder Road (offices / warehouse)
 Invincible Road (industrial)
 North Lane (industrial)
 Redan Hill Estate (industrial)
 Southwood Business Park (offices)

Southampton
 Bernard Street (offices / warehouse)
 Centurion Industrial Park (warehouse / industrial)
 City Industrial Park (industrial / warehouse)
 Hazel Road & Willments Yard (industrial / warehouse)
 Kemps Quay (industrial)
 Millbrook Trading Estate (industrial / warehouse / offices)
 Millbrook Industrial Estate (industrial / warehouse)
 Solent Business Centre (industrial / warehouse)
 Trinity Manor Industrial Estate (industrial / warehouse)
 Western Docks (industrial / warehouse)

Winchester
 Solent Business Park, Whiteley (offices)
 Winnall Industrial Estate (industrial / warehouse)
 Bar End Industrial Estate (industrial / warehouse)

See also 
 Hampshire
 Small business
 Business Link

External links 
 Hampshire Business Awards
 Hampshire County Council
 Hampshire & IoW Sustainable Business Partnership
 The Forum Solent Business Park in Fareham

Economy of Hampshire